The Registration and Electoral Office (REO) is a department under the jurisdiction of the Constitutional and Mainland Affairs Bureau of the Hong Kong Government. It is also an administrative support organisation of the Electoral Affairs Commission (EAC), which assists the implementation of the statutory rights under the Electoral Affairs Commission Ordinance.

The REO assists members of the public to register as electors, dividing constituencies, and formulating electoral regulations and guidelines for election activities. The elections of Chief Executive, Legislative Council and District Council are all managed by the office. However, the REO is a logistics department and has no decision-making power on the electoral policy as the decision-making power is vested in the EAC.

The head office is at the Treasury Building|in Cheung Sha Wan, with several other divisions at the Millennium City in Kwun Tong and Kowloonbay International Trade & Exhibition Centre in Kowloon Bay.

See also
Elections in Hong Kong
Hong Kong Civil Service

Notes

References

Elections in Hong Kong
Hong Kong government departments and agencies